The Ocala SunTran is the public transportation agency that serves the Marion County, Florida. Service operates Monday through Saturday.

Route list

External links
 SunTran Bus System (Official Website)

Bus transportation in Florida
Transportation in Marion County, Florida
Ocala, Florida
RATP Group